Richard Miles may refer to:

Richard Miles (diplomat) (born 1937), US diplomat
Richard Miles (historian) (born 1969), British historian and archaeologist
Richard Miles (Tswana catechist), Motswana (Tswana) catechist and preacher in South Africa
Richard Pius Miles (1791–1860), Roman Catholic bishop of Nashville
Dick Miles (1925–2010), American table tennis player
Richard Miles, pen name of Gerald Richard Perreau-Saussine, better known as American child actor Peter Miles (1938–2002)

See also
Rick Miles, Canadian politician